"Propuesta Indecente" ("Indecent Proposal") is a bachata song by American singer Romeo Santos from his second studio album Formula, Vol. 2. The song mixes the sound of Dominican bachata and Argentinean tango. The music video was filmed in Argentina and features Mexican entertainer Eiza González and earned the Lo Nuestro Award for Video of the Year at the 26th Lo Nuestro Awards. The following year it received the Lo Nuestro Award for Tropical Song of the Year. As of September 2022, the video has received over 1.9 billion views on the video-sharing website YouTube. , "Propuesta Indecente" is the second best-performing Latin song of all-time on the Billboard Hot Latin Songs chart following "Despacito".

Chart performance

Weekly charts

Year-end charts

Decade-end charts

All time charts

Certifications

|-

See also
 List of number-one Billboard Hot Latin Songs of 2013
 List of most-viewed YouTube videos

References

2013 songs
2013 singles
Romeo Santos songs
Songs written by Romeo Santos
Record Report Top 100 number-one singles
Record Report Top Latino number-one singles
Sony Music Latin singles